Stratfield Mortimer is a village and civil parish, just south of Reading, in the English county of Berkshire and unitary authority area of West Berkshire.

Geography
The south and south-east half of the parish consists of farms with a small percentage of woodland and is bisected by the Foudry Brook and is adjacent to the Reading to Basingstoke Line which is more than 40% on raised embankments but in the far south is in a cutting. The linear village of Stratfield Mortimer climbs Mortimer Hill which rises westward from the Foudry Brook.  It has no fixed formal or historic boundaries with Mortimer Common (often colloquially referred to simply as Mortimer), the more populated parts of the parish are located at the top of the hill.

The north-western 5% of the land is Mortimer Woods or common land which blends into Wokefield Common - Mortimer Woods has a set of scheduled monuments – one large, steep Bronze Age round barrow and three further smaller bowl barrows. The Foudry Brook is crossed by the scenic Victorian Tun Bridge. The Lockram Brook flows through the middle of the parish and there is more than 10% woodland making up the parish open to the public under the Countryside and Rights of Way Act 2000 including Starvale Woods, Wokefield Common and Holden Firs. The southern boundary is a straight footpath called the Devil's Highway because it sits on the line of the western stretch of the Roman road from Londinium (London) to Calleva Atrebatum (Silchester).

Other villages in the parish

Mortimer Common
The main settlement in this parish is Mortimer Common which has a surgery, dentist, pharmacy, a post office, a hardware shop, Co-op supermarket, Morrisons convenience store, travel agent, Chinese/fish and chips take away, the Church of England parish church of St John the Evangelist and Mortimer Methodist Church. Next to the church is St John's Infant School, now federated with St. Mary's Junior School which is down the hill, nearer the station. At the centre of Mortimer Common, in The Fairground, are 20 acres of land managed by the parish council for public recreation.

The large house, Mortimer Hill, is the historic home of the Hunter family. There are three pubs in the village, each on one of the three main roads through the village: The Horse and Groom in The Street opposite Mortimer Fairground, The Victoria Arms in Victoria Road and The Turner's Arms in West End Road. A new Mortimer village hall with a cricket pavilion has been constructed on the Fairground, it is available for hire.  There is also the St John's Hall, that houses the Mortimer Pre-School, holds amateur dramatic shows and is available for hire.

Mortimer West End
Before the mid-nineteenth century when parishes were only ecclesiastical, Stratfield Mortimer was a cross-county parish: the Hampshire part was known as Mortimer West End. It became an ecclesiastical parish in 1866> and acquired its own civil parish in 1894. A faint vestige of this is that Stratfield Mortimer ecclesiastical parish today includes Wokefield Common and a small uninhabited fraction of Mortimer West End.

Amenities

The village includes the Cinnamon]] Tree Indian restaurant, formerly the Fox]] and Horn, and prior to that, the Railway Inn public house, St Mary's Church of England parish church, Mortimer St. John's Infant School, Mortimer St. Mary's Junior School and the headquarters of the Berkshire Federation of Women's Institutes. Stratfield Mortimer is served by  railway station on the Reading to Basingstoke Line. Reading Buses run the Vitality 2 and 2a routes from Mortimer to Peppard Common via Burghfield,  Station & Sonning Common.

Sport
Mortimer Tennis club, play from 2 courts on the Fairground. Mortimer Cricket Club, play out of the Mortimer village hall on the Fairground. Mortimer Football Club, play on the Alfred Palmer Memorial Field to the west of Mortimer, beside The Turners Arms. The local golf course is at Wokefield Park.

Demography

Nearest places

References

External links

Villages in Berkshire
West Berkshire District
Civil parishes in Berkshire